Taambati Moussa, born Abdou, whose real name is Moussa Harouna Taambati, is a Mahoraise activist.

Taambati is known to be one of the guardians of the cultural, traditional, and culinary heritage of Mayotte.

Awards and nominations 
 Ordre national du Mérite
 Ordre des Arts et des Lettres

References 

Mayotte women
Living people
Year of birth missing (living people)